Lee-Anne Liebenberg is a South African stuntwoman, actress, stunt coordinator and precision driver. She is known for her work on Doomsday (2008), Chappie (2015) and District 9 (2009).

In 1995, she represented South Africa in International Gladiators 2.

Filmography

As Stuntwoman

Film 

 Bloodshot, stunt performer (2020)
 Revolt, stunt double of Bérénice Marlohe (2017)
 I Am Not a Witch, stunt coordinator (2017)
 Resident Evil: The Final Chapter (2016)
 Skorokoro, stunt coordinator (2016)
 Mignon Mossie van Wyk, stunt coordinator (2016)
 Avengers: Age of Ultron (2015)
Chappie (2015)
 Stuur groete aan Mannetjies Roux (2013)
 Safari (2013) 
 Layla Fourie, assistant rigger/precision driver (2013)
 Vehicle 19 (2013)
 Death Race 2 (2010)
 District 9 (2009)
 Ouma se Slim Kind, fight choreographer (2007)
 Prey, stunt coordinator/stunt double (2007)
 Primeval (2007)
 The Breed (2006)
 Consequence (2003) 
 Sumuru (2003) 
 Panic (2002) 
 Askari (2001) 
 Cold Harvest (1999)
 Sweepers (1998) 
 Orion's Key (1996) 
 Danger Zone (1996) 
 Warhead (1996) 
 Live Wire 2: Human Timebomb (1995)
 Lunarcop (1995) 
 Never Say Die (1994) 
 Cyborg Cop II (1994) 
 Fleshtone (1994) 
 Project Shadowchaser II (1994) 
 Yankee Zulu (1993)

TV 

 Vlug na Egipte, stunt coordinator (2015)
 Silent Witness (2008)
 Uncle Max (2006)
 Supernova (2005)
 Slipstream (2005) 
 Home Alone 4 (2002) 
 Operation Delta Force, assistant stunt coordinator (1997)

As Actress

Film 

 Rogue, TJ (2020)
 Impunity (2014)
 Death Race 2 (2010)
 Doomsday, Viper (2008)
 Straight Outta Benoni (2005)
 Wake of Death (2004)
 Merlin: The Return (2000)
 Cold Harvest (1999)
 Warhead (1996)
 Fleshtone (1994)

TV 

 Blood Drive, Abby the Nun (2017)
 Planet of the Apemen: Battle for Earth (2011)
 Charlie Jade (2005)
 Shark Attack (1999)
 Tarzan: The Epic Adventures (1997)

References

External links 
 Official website of Lee-Anne Liebenberg
 

South African actresses
Living people
Year of birth missing (living people)